Holiday Europe Limited is a Bulgarian charter airline founded in 2019 based in Sofia.

History 
In the beginning of August 2019, it was announced that Mr. Aybars Balabaner, a German citizen, would invest in the new airline. Onur Air (via Mr. Balabaner) provided the new airline with its first aircraft – an Airbus A321 – and it would continue to support the airline technically and logistically until further notice. Aybars Balabaner owned 95% of Holiday Europe Ltd.,the other 5% was owns by Managing Director Petko Christoff. In the end of December 2021, Holiday Europe had a new Ownership, Jet Sky Ltd. that owned 90% of shares of Mr. Aybars Balabaner. On 24 August 2019, the airline received its Air Operating Certificate (AOC).

After flight operations had been suspended since December 2020, the company's AOC was temporarily suspended in October 2021, after ending the cooperation with now defunct Onur Air. As of June 2022, the airline's AOC is no longer suspended.

Destinations 
The airline operated charter flights out of several European airports to leisure destinations in the Mediterranean, the Canary Islands, Egypt, and UAE.

Fleet 

As of March 2021, Holiday Europe operated the following aircraft:

References

External links 
Official website

Airlines established in 2019
Charter airlines
Bulgarian companies established in 2019